Butyrsky District  is an administrative district (raion) of North-Eastern Administrative Okrug, and one of the 125 raions of Moscow, Russia. It is 6 km north of the Moscow city center, located just outside the third ring road, with Timiryazevsky District to the west and Marfino District and Maryina roshcha District to the east. Population: 68,700 (2017 est.).

History
History first records the village of Butyrka in the 14th century, on the road from Moscow north to Dmitriv (that road is now Butyrskaya Street running up the western border of the district.)  The village eventually came into the possession of boyar Nikita Romanovich Zakharin, the grandfather of Tsar Michael I.  The farming area gradually developed as a soldier's settlement, then as a fashionable residential area after 1812.  After WWII, the area developed with blocks of apartment buildings.

See also
Administrative divisions of Moscow

References

Notes

Sources

Districts of Moscow
North-Eastern Administrative Okrug